The 1891 Greensburg Athletic Association season was their second season in existence. The team's record for this season is largely unknown.

Schedule

Game notes

References

Greensburg Athletic Association
Greensburg Athletic Association seasons
Greensburg Athletic Association